DLV may refer to:

 555 (number), written as DLV in Roman numerals
 DataLog with Disjunction, a logic programming system, referred to as DLV
 Delavirdine (DLV), a non-nucleoside reverse transcriptase inhibitor (NNRTI) marketed by ViiV Healthcare
 DNSSEC Lookaside Validation, a DNS record type in Domain Name System Security Extensions
 German Air Sports Association, Deutscher Luftsportverband or DLV, clandestine predecessor of the Luftwaffe
 German Agricultural Workers' Union, Deutscher Landarbeiter-Verband or DLV, a former trade union
 German Athletics Association, Deutscher Leichtathletik-Verband or DLV, governing body of athletics in Germany